Annianus of Alexandria ( was a monk who flourished in Alexandria during the bishopric of Theophilus of Alexandria around the beginning of the 5thcentury. He criticized the world history of his contemporary monk Panodorus of Alexandria for relying too much on secular sources rather than biblical sources for his dates.

This created the Alexandrian Era whose first day was the first day of the proleptic Alexandrian civil year in progress, . The former is known as the Era of Grace in the Coptic Church, whereas the latter is known as the Era of Martyrs. He was the first computist to recognize the 532-year cycle of Easters in the Julian calendar. This cycle is often attributed to Victorius of Aquitaine in 457, the first to recognize such a cycle in the West.

None of Annianus's writings have survived. He is principally known from the discussion of his works by George Syncellus during the 9th century, though lesser fragments appear elsewhere. Elijah of Nisibis cites him in his 11th-century Chronography.

However, Annianus’ Paschal table of 532 years, containing a 532-year Paschal cycle based on a Metonic 19-year lunar cycle, has survived. Its Metonic 19-year lunar cycle was adopted by bishop Cyril of Alexandria, who used it in his own (Greek language and Alexandrian calendar) Paschal table of 114 years. Shortly before Cyril's death (AD444), a beginning was made with a Latin language and Julian calendar Paschal table probably intended for use in the Latin part of Europe; this resulted in a similar Paschal table of 95 years, referred to as ‘the Paschal table attributed to Cyril’, which covered time interval . A century later this Paschal table was continued by Dionysius Exiguus to a Paschal table covering time interval , two centuries hereafter his Paschal table was extended to Bede’s Easter table covering time interval  and containing a 532-year Paschal cycle. We conclude that it is precisely Annianus’ variant of the Metonic 19-year lunar cycle (invented by Anatolius) which from the sixth to the sixteenth century has been the core of the computus paschalis in the Latin Christian world, because it was not earlier than in the year 1582 that the Julian calendar was replaced with the Gregorian calendar.

As far as Victorius of Aquitaine is concerned, Jan Zuidhoek, pretending to mention explicitly all relevant Metonic 19-year lunar cycles, has missed an opportunity to mention Victorius’ one. However, Alden Mosshammer has mentioned it explicitly. In principle, each date of the 532-year Paschal cycle of Victorius’ Paschal table can be calculated by applying the old Roman rule “Paschal Sunday is the first Sunday after the first day after the Paschal full moon” to the corresponding date of the Paschal full moon of its lunar cycle (if desired with the help of the number indicating the weekday of ).

References

Bibliography
 William Adler. Time immemorial: archaic history and its sources in Christian chronography from Julius Africanus to George Syncellus. Washington, D.C.: Dumbarton Oaks Research Library and Collection, 1989.
 William Adler, Paul Tuffin, translators. The chronography of George Synkellos: a Byzantine chronicle of universal history from the creation. Oxford: Oxford University Press, 2002,. Synkellos copied large blocks of text written by Annianus.
 Georges Declercq (2000) Anno Domini (The Origins of the Christian Era): Turnhout
 
 Otto Neugebauer (1979) Ethiopic Astronomy and Computus: Wien
 Jan Zuidhoek (2019) Reconstructing Metonic 19-year Lunar Cycles (on the basis of NASA’s Six Millennium Catalog of Phases of the Moon): Zwolle

External links 
 Five Metonic 19-year lunar cycles

Byzantine theologians
5th-century Byzantine historians
5th-century Byzantine monks
Egyptian Christian monks
Egyptian historians
Historians of Christianity
5th-century Byzantine writers
5th-century Christian theologians
Chronologists
5th-century Egyptian people